Docohammus bennigseni is a species of beetle in the family Cerambycidae. It was described by Per Olof Christopher Aurivillius in 1908. It is known from Tanzania, Ethiopia, Namibia, Kenya, and Somalia. It feeds on Acalypha neptunica.

Subspecies
 Docohammus bennigseni aethiopicus Teocchi, Jiroux & Sudre, 2004
 Docohammus bennigseni bennigseni Aurivillius, 1908
 Docohammus bennigseni franzae Dillon & Dillon, 1959
 Docohammus benningseni somalicus Teocchi, 1991

References

Lamiini
Beetles described in 1908